The White Sonata (German: Die weiße Sonate) is a 1928 Austrian silent drama film directed by Louis Seeman and starring Carla Bartheel, Vladimir Sokoloff and Paul Askonas.

The film's sets were designed by the art director Emil Stepanek.

Cast
 Carla Bartheel as Dina Dellmar, eine Tänzerin 
 Vladimir Sokoloff as Violinvirtuose Dollhofer, Dinas Vater 
 Paul Askonas as Fürst Saxenburg, Chef der Geheimpolizei 
 Werner Pittschau as Oberleutnant Graf Boris Utomski 
 Vivian Gibson as Nata Ignatiew, Frau des Governeurs 
 Richard Waldemar as Ramolli 
 Hanni Hoess
 Clementine Plessner
 Hans Melzer
 Hanns Marschall
 René Pryken

References

Bibliography
 James Robert Parish. Hollywood character actors. Arlington House, 1978.

External links

1928 films
1928 drama films
Austrian drama films
Austrian silent feature films
Austrian black-and-white films
Silent drama films
1920s German-language films